The Democratic Republic of Georgia (DRG) was the first modern establishment of a republic of Georgia, which existed from May 1918 to February 1921. Recognized by all major European powers of the time, DRG was created in the wake of the Russian Revolution of 1917, which led to the collapse of the Russian Empire and allowed territories formerly under Saint Petersburg's rule to assert independence. In contrast to Bolshevik Russia, DRG was governed by a moderate, multi-party political system led by the Georgian Social Democratic Party (Menshevik).

Initially, DRG was a protectorate of the German Empire. However, after the German defeat in World War I, the country was partially occupied by British troops, who were sent there to counter a proposed Bolshevik invasion. The British had to leave in 1920 because of the Treaty of Moscow, in which Russia recognized Georgia's independence in exchange for DRG not hosting forces hostile to Russia's interests. Now that Western European powers were no longer present in Georgia, in February 1921 the Bolshevik Red Army proceeded to invade the country, leading to DRG's defeat and collapse by March of that year, with Georgia becoming a Soviet republic. The Georgian Government, led by Prime Minister Noe Jordania, moved to France where it continued to work in exile. The government-in-exile was recognized by France, Britain, Belgium, and Poland as the only legitimate government of Georgia until the 1930s, when growing Soviet power and political processes in Europe made it impractical to do so indefinitely.

Although short-lived, DRG continues to be an inspiration for modern day Georgia due to its legacy of democracy and pluralism. DRG was one of the first countries in Europe to grant women the right to vote as enshrined in the Georgian constitution, which was “unusual in most European constitutions at the time”. Several women of varying backgrounds were elected to the Georgian parliament, as were representatives of nine ethnicities, including Germans, Russians, Armenians, Azerbaijanis, and Jews. DRG also saw the founding of Georgia's first fully fledged university, thereby realizing a longstanding goal cherished by generations of Georgian intellectuals whose efforts were, up to that point, consistently frustrated by the Imperial Russian authorities.

Background 

After the February Revolution of 1917 and collapse of the tsarist administration in the Caucasus, most powers were held by the Special Transcaucasian Committee (Ozakom, short for Osobyi Zakavkazskii Komitet) of the Russian Provisional Government. All of the soviets in Georgia were firmly controlled by the Georgian Social Democratic Party, who followed the lead of the Petrograd Soviet and supported the Provisional Government. The Bolshevist October Revolution changed the situation drastically. The Caucasian Soviets refused to recognize Vladimir Lenin's regime. Threats from the increasingly Bolshevistic deserting soldiers of the former Caucasus army, ethnic clashes and anarchy in the region forced Georgian, Armenian and Azerbaijani politicians to create a unified regional authority known as the Transcaucasian Commissariat (November 14, 1917) and later a legislature, the Sejm (January 23, 1918). On April 22, 1918, the Sejm – Nikolay Chkheidze was the president – declared the Transcaucasus an independent democratic federation with an executive Transcaucasian government chaired by Evgeni Gegechkori and later by Akaki Chkhenkeli.

Many Georgians, influenced by the ideas of Ilia Chavchavadze and other intellectuals from the late 19th century, insisted on national independence. A cultural national awakening was further strengthened by the restoration of the autocephaly of the Georgian Orthodox Church (March 12, 1917) and the establishment of a national university in Tbilisi (1918). In contrast, the Georgian Mensheviks regarded independence from Russia as a temporary step against the Bolshevik revolution and considered calls for Georgia's independence chauvinistic and separatist. The union of Transcaucasus was short-lived though. Undermined by increasing internal tensions and by pressure from the German and Ottoman empires, the federation collapsed on May 26, 1918, when Georgia declared independence. Two days later both Armenia and Azerbaijan declared their independence as well.

History

Recognition

Georgia was immediately recognized by Germany and the Ottoman Empire. The young state had to place itself under German protection and to cede its largely Muslim-inhabited regions (including the cities of Batumi, Ardahan, Artvin, Akhaltsikhe and Akhalkalaki) to the Ottoman government (Treaty of Batum, June 4). However, German support enabled the Georgians to repel the Bolshevik threat from Abkhazia. German forces were almost certainly under the command of Friedrich Freiherr Kress von Kressenstein. Following the German defeat in the First World War, British occupation forces arrived in the country, with the permission of the Georgian government. Relations between the British and the local population were more strained than they had been with the Germans. British-held Batumi remained out of Georgia's control until 1920. In December 1918, a British force was deployed in Tbilisi too.

Georgia's relations with its neighbors were uneasy. Territorial disputes with Armenia, Denikin's White Russian government and Azerbaijan led to armed conflicts in the first two cases. A British military mission attempted to mediate these conflicts in order to consolidate all anti-Bolshevik forces in the region. To prevent White Russian army forces from crossing into the newly established states, the British commander in the region drew a line across the Caucasus that Denikin would not be permitted to cross, giving both Georgia and Azerbaijan temporary relief. The threat of invasion by Denikin's forces, notwithstanding the British position, brought Georgia and Azerbaijan together in a mutual defense alliance on June 16, 1919.

On February 14, 1919, Georgia held parliamentary elections won by the Social Democratic Party of Georgia with 81.5% of the vote. On March 21, Noe Zhordania formed the third government, which had to deal with armed peasants' revolts incited by local Bolshevik activists and largely supported from Russia. These became more troublesome when carried out by ethnic minorities such as Abkhazians and Ossetians.

However, the land reform was finally well handled by the Georgian Social Democratic Party government and the country established a multi-party system in sharp contrast with the "dictatorship of the proletariat" established by the Bolsheviks in Russia. In 1919, reforms in the judicial system and local self-governance were carried out. Abkhazia was granted autonomy. Nevertheless, ethnic issues continued to trouble the country, especially on the part of the Ossetians, as witnessed in May 1920.

Downfall

The year 1920 was marked by increased threats from the Russian SFSR. With the defeat of the White movement and the Red Armies' advance to the Caucasus frontiers, the republic's situation became extremely tense. In January, the Soviet leadership offered Georgia, Armenia and Azerbaijan an alliance against the White armies in South Russia and the Caucasus. The Government of the DRG refused to enter any military alliance, referring to its policy of neutrality and noninterference, but suggested negotiations towards a political settlement of the relations between two countries in the hope that this might lead to recognition of Georgia's independence by Moscow. Severe criticism of the Georgian refusal by Russian leaders was followed by several attempts by local communists to organize mass anti-government protests, which ended unsuccessfully.

In April 1920, the 11th Red Army established a Soviet regime in Azerbaijan, and the Georgian Bolshevik Sergo Orjonikidze requested permission from Moscow to advance into Georgia. Though official consent was not granted by Lenin and Sovnarkom, local Bolsheviks attempted to seize the Military School of Tbilisi as a preliminary to a coup d'état on May 3, 1920, but were successfully repelled by General Kvinitadze. The Georgian government began mobilization and appointed Giorgi Kvinitadze commander-in-chief. In the meantime, in response to Georgia's alleged provision of assistance to the Azeri nationalist rebellion in Ganja, Soviet forces attempted to penetrate Georgian territory, but were repelled by Kvinitadze in brief border clashes at the Red Bridge. Within a few days, peace talks resumed in Moscow. Under the terms of the controversial Moscow Peace Treaty of May 7, Georgian independence was recognized in return for the legalization of Bolshevik organizations and a commitment not to allow foreign troops on Georgian soil.

A vote at the League of Nations on granting membership to Georgia was held on December 16, 1920, with the resolution defeated: 10 voted for it, 13 against, and 19 abstained. Georgia gained de jure recognition from the Allies on January 27, 1921. This, however, did not prevent the country from being annexed by the Red Army to the Soviet Russia.

After Azerbaijan and Armenia had been Sovietized by the Red Army, Georgia found itself surrounded by hostile Soviet republics. Moreover, as the British had already evacuated the Caucasus, the country was left without any foreign support.

According to Soviet sources, relations with Georgia deteriorated over alleged violations of the peace treaty, re-arrests of Georgian Bolsheviks, obstruction of convoys passing through Georgia to Armenia, and a strong suspicion that Georgia was aiding armed rebels in the North Caucasus. For its part, Georgia accused Moscow of fomenting anti-government riots in various regions of the country, and of provoking border incidents in the Zaqatala region, disputed with the Azerbaijan Democratic Republic. The Lori “neutral zone” was another challenge, as Soviet Armenia categorically demanded that Georgia withdraw the troops that had been stationed in the region since the fall of the Armenian Republic.

Government and law 

The Act of Independence of Georgia, declared on May 26, 1918, in brief, outlined the main principles of the nation's future democracy. According to this act, “the Democratic Republic of Georgia equally guarantees to every citizen within her limits political rights irrespective of nationality, creed, social rank or sex". The first government, formed the same day, was led by Noe Ramishvili. In October 1918, the National Council of Georgia has renamed the Parliament and announced new elections to be held on February 14, 1919.

During its two-year history (1919–1921), the newly elected Constituent Assembly of Georgia, with Nikolay Chkheidze as president, adopted 126 laws; these included laws on citizenship, local elections, defence, the official language, agriculture, the legal system, political and administrative arrangements for ethnic minorities (including an act about the People's Council of Abkhazia), a national system of public education, and some other laws and regulations on fiscal and monetary policy, railways, and trade and domestic production. On February 21, 1921, facing the onset of Soviet aggression, the Constituent Assembly adopted a constitution of the Democratic Republic of Georgia, the first modern fundamental law in the nation's history, placing emphasis on human rights.

The country was governed as a type of decentralized unitary parliamentary republic with an executive, with the constitution stating that "the state belongs to all the people. Parliament exercises the sovereignty of the nation within the framework of this constitution." The three decentralized regions included the Abkhaz Autonomy, the Autonomy of Muslim Georgia, and the Zaqatala Region, which were granted autonomy in local affairs. The Chairman of the Government was the chief executive post, approved by the parliament for one-year terms of office (the post could not be held for more than two consecutive terms). The chairman appointed ministers and was responsible for governing the country and representing Georgia in foreign relations. However, the person in the position did not have some privileges common to dual-heads of state and heads of government, such as the ability to dissolve parliament or veto legislation. The 1919 government of Georgia adopted a law on jury trials. The right to trial by jury for serious criminal, political and print cases was incorporated into the 1921 Constitution. The highest court was the Senate, indirectly elected by the parliament. Any changes to the constitution must have first been approved by 2/3 of the legislature, and then a majority of the voting public in a referendum.

International recognition 

Under the terms of the Moscow Peace Treaty of May 7, Georgian independence was recognized by Soviet Russia in return for the legalization of Bolshevik organizations and a commitment not to allow foreign troops on Georgian soil.

The independence of the Democratic Republic of Georgia was de jure recognized by Romania, Argentina, Germany, Turkey, Belgium, United Kingdom, France, Japan, Italy, Poland, Czechoslovakia, Siam and Estonia, among other countries.

The Government of the Democratic Republic of Georgia in Exile continued to be recognized by many European states as the only legal government of Georgia for some time after 1921. The Government of the Democratic Republic of Georgia in Exile lasted until 1954 continuing to oppose Soviet rule in Georgia.

Political geography 
Georgia's 1918–1921 borders were formed through the border conflicts with its neighbors and ensuing treaties and conventions.

In the north, Georgia was bordered by various Russian Civil War polities until Bolshevik power was established in the North Caucasus in the spring of 1920. The international border between Soviet Russia and Georgia was regulated by the 1920 Moscow Treaty. During the Sochi conflict with the Russian White movement, Georgia briefly controlled the Sochi district in 1918.

In the southwest, the DRG's border with the Ottoman Empire changed with the course of World War I and was modified after the Ottoman defeat in the hostilities. Georgia regained control over Artvin, Ardahan, part of Batum province, Akhaltsikhe and Akhalkalaki. Batum was finally incorporated into the republic after the British evacuated the area in 1920. The Treaty of Sèvres of 1920 granted Georgia control over eastern Lazistan including Rize and Hopa. However, the Georgian government, unwilling to become embroiled in a new war with Turkish Revolutionaries, took no steps to take control of these areas.

The border disputes with the First Republic of Armenia over a part of Borchalo district led to a brief war between the two countries in December 1918. With the British intervention the Lori "neutral zone" was created, only to be reoccupied by Georgia after the fall of the Armenian Republic at the end of 1920.

The dispute, however, never led to hostilities and relations between the two countries were generally peaceful until the Sovietization of Azerbaijan.

The 1919 projects and the 1921 constitution of Georgia granted Abkhazia, Ajaria and Zaqatala a degree of autonomy. Article 107 of the constitution gave autonomy to Abkhazia and Zaqatala. However, due to the Red Army invasion, the exact nature of this autonomy was never determined. It did however serve as the first time in the modern era that Abkhazia was defined as a geographic entity.

The territory of the Democratic Republic of Georgia included some territories that today belong to other countries. It was circa 107,600 km2, compared to 69,700 km2 in modern Georgia. The Soviet occupation of the DRG led to significant territorial rearrangements by which Georgia lost almost a third of its territory. Artvin, Ardahan and part of Batumi provinces were ceded to Turkey, Armenia gained control of Lori, and Azerbaijan obtained Zaqatala district. A portion of the Georgian marches along the Greater Caucasus Mountains was taken by Russia.

Demographics 
Forming principally on the territories of the Tiflis and Kutais governorates, as well as the Batum Oblast and Sukhumi Okrug, the Georgian Democratic Republic following the Treaty of Batum consisted of 1,607,000 Georgians, 535,000 Armenians, 200,000 Muslims, and 510,000 others, totalling 2,852,000 inhabitants.

By 1921, following the fall of the Armenian and Azerbaijani republics and Georgia's reacquisition of the Lori and Zakatal districts, the population reached 2,677,000 according to a Soviet source, with an urban population of 475,000 (17.7%). This is supported by the results of the 1926 Soviet census in Georgia some 5 years later which indicated a population of 2,667,000, indicative of the loss of the aforementioned Lori and Zakatal districts to neighbouring Armenia and Azerbaijan respectively.

Armed forces 

The People's Guard was the privileged military force in the country. Founded on September 5, 1917, as the Worker's Guard, it was later renamed the Red Guard, and finally the People's Guard. It was a highly politicized military structure placed directly under the control of parliament rather than the Ministry of War. Throughout its existence (1917–1921), the Guard was under the command of the Menshevik activist Valiko Jugheli.

The DRG also formed its own regular army. The only part of it was armed in peacetime, the majority being on furlough and following their callings. If the republic had been in danger, they would have been called up by the General Staff, supplied with arms, and allotted to their places. General Giorgi Kvinitadze was commander-in-chief, two times.

From March 1919 to October 1920, the Georgian army was reorganized. It consisted of 3 infantry brigades (later coalesced into one division), 1 cavalry brigade, 2 fortress regiments, 3 artillery brigades, a sapper battalion, a telegraph platoon, a motor squadron with an armored car detachment, a cavalry regiment, and a military school. A People's Guard consisted of 4 regular battalions. It could further mobilize 18 battalions, i.e., one division. Thus, in 1920, the Georgian army and People's Guard together comprised 16 infantry battalions (1 army division and an NG regiment), 1 sapper battalion, 5 field artillery divisions, 2 cavalry legions, 2 motor squadrons with 2 armored car detachments, an air detachment and 4 armored trains. Beyond staff and fortress regiments, the army totaled 27,000. Mobilization could increase this number to 87,000. The Georgian navy possessed 1 destroyer, 4 fighter aircraft, 4 torpedo boats, 4 mineboats, and 10 steamboats.

Although the republic had access to almost 200,000 veterans of World War I with skilled generals and officers, the government failed to build up an effective defense system, a factor that greatly contributed to its collapse.

Economy 
When the DRG was proclaimed, the Georgian economy was not in a strong position. While economic issues were a European-wide issue in 1918 (owing to the First World War), as a new state Georgia faced considerably more difficulties. There were two main issues immediately facing Georgia: economic dependence on Russia, and the need to industralise a largely agrarian society. Further causing issues was a lack of direction from the Georgian government, which also tried to implement a socialist-based policy into economic matters, despite lacking the financial backing to keep the economy stable.

As part of the Russian Empire Georgia had been partially industrialised, with natural resource extraction becoming a major feature of exports from the region. However, as historian Stephen F. Jones has noted, imperial Russian policies served the metropolitan needs and imperial integration and there was no regional "strategy of economic development beyond state production of raw materials, the development of transport, military supplies and specialized crops such as tea, tobacco, and cotton." This was also seen on an ethnic scale: the overwhelming amount of traders and business-owners in Georgia were ethnic Armenian, while the administration was composed largely of ethnic Russians. Ethnic Georgians mainly remained in agriculture or took up unskilled labour positions in the cities. This division of labour between ethnic groups proved difficult to reconcile once the DRG was established, and in the aftermath of the Georgian–Armenian War in December 1918 anti-Armenian sentiment throughout Georgia made the Armenian-dominated business class reluctant to help implement needed changes to improve the economy.

Agriculture had been the dominant feature of the Georgian economy, and would remain as such throughout the existence of the DRG. Approximately 79% of the population worked on the land, though the methods used were outdated and far from efficient. This caused food shortages in the cities, and despite 81% of all arable land being used for grains, imports were also required, as was a ban on exporting food products like grain, fruits and vegetables.

The manganese industry at Chiatura was of great importance to European metallurgy, providing about 70% of the world supply of manganese in the early 20th century. Traditionally, Georgia served also as an international transportation corridor through the key Black Sea ports of Batumi and Poti. However the First World War had a devastating effect on this industry as well. The Black Sea had been blockaded throughout the war, severely limiting the amount of exports. This led to a drastic reduction in economic activity in Georgia: the workforce at Chiatura dropped from 3,500 in 1913 to 250 in 1919, with the numbers only starting to rise in 1920. Emerging markets in Brazil and India also meant that the Chiatura mines were less important on a global scale, further weakening their output.

The lack of international recognition and the government's only partially successful policy in the field hindered the economic development of the DRG and the country suffered an economic crisis. Some signs of improvement were observed towards 1920–1921.

Education, science and culture 

The most important event in the country's cultural life during this turbulent period was indeed the foundation of a national university in Tbilisi (now known as the Tbilisi State University) (1918), a long-time dream of Georgians thwarted by the Imperial Russian authorities for several decades. Other educational centers included gymnasiums in Tbilisi, Batumi, Kutaisi, Ozurgeti, Poti and Gori, Tbilisi Military School, Gori Pedagogical Seminary, the Pedagogical Seminary for Women, etc. Georgia also had a number of schools for ethnic minorities.

The National Museum of Georgia, theaters in Tbilisi and Kutaisi, the Tbilisi National Opera House, and the National Academy of Art were in the vanguard of cultural life.

The newspapers Sakartvelos Respublika ("Republic of Georgia"), Sakartvelo ("Georgia"), Ertoba ("Unity"), Samshoblo ("Motherland"), Sakhalkho Sakme ("Public Affair"), The Georgian Messenger and The Georgian Mail (both published in English) led the national press.

Legacy 

The 1918–1921 independence of Georgia, though short-lived, was of particular importance for the development of national feeling among Georgians, a major factor that made the country one of the most active independent forces within the Soviet Union. Leaders of the national movement of the late 1980s frequently referred to the DRG as a victory in the struggle against the Russian Empire and drew parallels with the contemporary political situation, portraying a somewhat idealized image of the Georgian First Republic.

On April 9, 1991, the independence of Georgia was restored when the Act of the Restoration of State Independence of Georgia was adopted by the Supreme Council of the Republic of Georgia. The national symbols used by the DRG were re-established as those of the newly independent nation and remained in use until 2004. May 26, the day of the establishment of the DRG, is still celebrated as a national holiday — the Independence Day of Georgia.

See also 

 1920 Gori earthquake
 Aftermath of World War I
 August Uprising
 Azerbaijan Democratic Republic
 Kars Oblast
 List of people associated with the Democratic Republic of Georgia

Notes

Bibliography

Further reading 

 "Legal Acts of the Democratic Republic of Georgia (1918–1921)", Tbilisi, 1990.  
 D. Ghambashidze, "Mineral resources of Georgia and Caucasia. Manganese industry of Georgia", London, 1919.
 O. Janelidze, "From May 26 to February 25", Tbilisi, 1990.  
 K. Kandelaki, "The Georgian Question Before the Free World", Paris, 1951.
 Karl Kautsky, Georgien. Eine sozialdemokratische Bauernrepublik. Eindrücke und Beobachtungen. Wiener Volksbuchhandlung, Wien 1921.  
 G. Kvinitadze, "My answer", Paris, 1954.  
 Al. Manvelichvili, "Histoire de la Georgie", Paris, 1951. 
 N. Matikashvili, M. Kvaliashvili, "Cadets". J. "Iveria", No 32, Paris, 1988.  
 G. Mazniashvili, "The Memoirs", Batumi, 1990.  
 K. Salia, "The History of Georgian Nation", Paris, 1983.
 P. Surguladze, "The international importance of the independence of Georgia", Istanbul, 1918.  
 P. Surguladze, "Georgia as the independent country", Istanbul, 1918.  
 V. Tevzadze, "The memoirs of the Georgian Officer". J. "Iveria", No 32, Paris, 1988.  
 I. Tseretelli, "Separation de la Transcaucasie et de la Russie et Independence de la Georgie", Paris, Imprimerie Chaix, 1919. 
 R. Tsukhishvili, "The English-Georgian Relations (1918–1921)", Tbilisi, 1995.  
 L. Urushadze, "Bolshevism-Menshevism and the Democratic Republic of Georgia (1918–1921)", 2nd edition, Publishing House "Ena da Kultura", Tbilisi, 2005, .

External links 

 70 years of Soviet Georgia by George Tarkhan-Mouravi.
 The Awakening of Georgia by David Schaich.
 Some national and ethnic problems in Georgia (1918–1922) by Avtandil Menteshashvili.
 Map of 1918–1921 at Armenica.org.
 Territorial rearrangements in Caucasus, 1920–1921
 "Kartuli Idea — The Georgian Idea" by Dr. Levan Z. Urushadze, 2008, .
 "Democratic Republic of Georgia (1918–1921) by Dr. Levan Z. Urushadze, 2006, .
 Georgia by Karl Kautsky, an anti-Bolshevik pamphlet.
 Between Red and White, a reply to Kautsky by Leon Trotsky.
 La Ière République de Géorgie.
 La Ière République de Géorgie en exil.
 100 Years of Georgia's First Democratic Republic

 
1910s in Georgia (country)
1920s in Georgia (country)
Modern history of Georgia (country)
Georgia
.
Social democracy
Georgia
Georgia
1918 establishments in Georgia (country)
1921 disestablishments in Georgia (country)
Georgia
Georgia
Georgia
Georgia
20th century in Georgia (country)
Georgia
Georgia
Georgia